Burak (Ɓúúrák) is an Adamawa language spoken in Burak town of Shongom LGA, Nigeria.

References

Languages of Nigeria
Bambukic languages